Medi1 Radio (also known as Radio Méditerranée Internationale) is a private, commercial Moroccan radio network. Medi 1 has an audience of around 23 million people. It is emitted from Nador transmitter on 171 kHz longwave, and via internet and satellite.

History and profile
Medi 1 Radio is owned by various banks and private companies from both Morocco and France. The station started broadcasting in 1980 and is based in Tangier, Morocco.

The radio station broadcasts throughout the Maghreb countries and it is a bilingual station broadcasting its programming in both Arabic and French.

Medi 1 was managed by Pierre Casalta from its foundation until 2010. The station officially says it is politically independent, however, two former Medi 1 journalists, writing for L'Obs, described it as the "voice of the King", noting its subjective coverage of the monarchy. Its slogan is Medi 1, la radio du grand Maghreb.

See also
 Medi1 TV
 Communications in Morocco

References

External links

1980 establishments in Morocco
Radio stations established in 1980
Radio stations in Morocco
Maghreb
Mass media in Tangier